Sarcone is a surname. Notable people with the surname include:

C. Robert Sarcone (1925–2020), American politician
Gianni A. Sarcone (born 1962), Italian visual artist and science writer

See also
Zarcone